The Measure of the Magic is a fantasy novel by American writer Terry Brooks, released on August 23, 2011 as the second of the two part Legends of Shannara series. Set after Bearers of the Black Staff and before First King of Shannara, the novel chronicles the adventures of Panterra Qu, a Tracker entrusted with the Black Staff after the death of Sider Ament during Bearers of the Black Staff.

References 

Shannara novels
2011 American novels
High fantasy novels
Del Rey books